Mather may refer to:

People
 Mather (given name), a list of  people with the given name
 Mather (surname), a list of people with the surname

Places
 Mather, California (disambiguation)
 Mather, Manitoba, Canada, a community
 Mather, Pennsylvania, an unincorporated community
 Mather, Wisconsin, an unincorporated community
 49700 Mather, an asteroid
 Mather Air Force Base, east of Sacramento, California
 Mathers Bridge, Merritt Island, Florida
 Mather Gorge, on the border between Maryland and Virginia
 Mount Mather (disambiguation)

Other uses
 Mather House (disambiguation)
 Mather Stock Car Company, an American corporation that built railroad rolling stock
 Mather Inn, a hotel in Ishpeming, Michigan
 Mather Tower, Chicago, Illinois
 The Mather School, oldest public elementary school in North America

See also
 Mathers